Kebebe is a traditional food in Lenggong, Perak.

Kebebe is made of 13 ingredients that has a bitter, salty, sweet, sour and spicy mixed taste. Its allegedly able to get rid of nausea after taking too much food.

Kebebe is usually served during the wedding parlors as a dessert or afternoon tea with hot beverages.

See also
 Cuisine of Malaysia

References

External links
 Kebebe

Malay cuisine
Snack foods